Emam Abbas may refer to:
 Emam Abbas-e Olya
 Emam Abbas-e Sofla